James Roberson is a Democratic member of the North Carolina House of Representatives who has represented the 38th district (including parts of Wake County) since his appointment in 2021. Roberson previously served as Mayor of Knightdale, North Carolina from 2015 to 2021.

Committee assignments

2021-2022 session
Appropriations 
Appropriations - Agriculture and Natural and Economic Resources
Insurance 
Pensions and Retirement 
State Personnel

Electoral history

References

External links

Living people
Year of birth missing (living people)
People from Knightdale, North Carolina
20th-century African-American people
21st-century American politicians
21st-century African-American politicians
African-American state legislators in North Carolina
Democratic Party members of the North Carolina House of Representatives